Borla is a surname. Notable people with the surname include:

Enrico Borla (born 1959), Italian writer
Hector Borla (1937–2002), Argentine painter and illustrator

See also
 Borla, a village in Bocşa Commune, Sălaj County, Romania
 In Spanish  means "tassel"

Spanish-language surnames
Italian-language surnames